Mount Pendleton is a  mountain in the Alaska Range, in Denali National Park and Preserve, to the east-northeast of Denali. It lies above the Polychrome Glaciers. Mount Pendleton was named in 1961 by the U.S. Geological Survey for topographer Thomas Percy Pendleton.

See also
Mountain peaks of Alaska

References

Alaska Range
Mountains of Denali Borough, Alaska
Denali National Park and Preserve
Mountains of Alaska
Mountains of Denali National Park and Preserve